John Oldham McGinnis is a professor at Northwestern University Pritzker School of Law and author of over 90 academic and popular articles and essays.  His popular writings have been published in The Wall Street Journal, National Review, and Policy Review.

McGinnis teaches and writes on constitutional and international law.  In constitutional law, he has focused especially on majority and supermajority rules.  In international law, he has focused on the question of the proper role of international law in United States law.

McGinnis graduated from the Phillips Exeter Academy in 1975, and earned a B.A. from Harvard University in 1978, an M.A. from Balliol College, Oxford University in 1980,  and a J.D. magna cum laude from Harvard in 1983.  In 1997 he received the Paul M. Bator Award, which is awarded annually by the Federalist Society to an "outstanding legal scholar" under forty.  McGinnis worked in the Office of Legal Counsel, Department of Justice from 1985 to 1991.  He has given 10 testimonies before congress. McGinnis was also a litigation associate at the prestigious Sullivan & Cromwell, and a clerk on the United States Court of Appeals for the District of Columbia.

McGinnis's government posts are currently as a member of the National Advisory Committee for the North American Agreement on Labor Cooperation, and as a roster member of the United States Panelists for Resolution of World Trade Organization Disputes. He is a member of the conservative Federalist Society.

Selected research
McGinnis is a co-author of a law review article stating that the majority of law school faculty members donate more to Democrats than to Republicans.  He uses this to attack the "viewpoint diversity" justification that the U.S. Supreme Court used to permit law schools to give racial minorities an advantage in their admissions processes.  His argument is that law schools are not, and probably should not be, committed to political viewpoint diversity in the hiring process (implying that they should not use affirmative action-like techniques in recruiting and admitting students).

McGinnis has published several books. In Accelerating Democracy:  Transforming Governance Through Technology (Princeton University Press, 2013) he argues that rapidly changing information technology can improve policy.  In Originalism and the Good Constitution (Harvard University Press, 2013) he and Mike Rappaport contend that interpreting the Constitution according to its original meaning continues to have beneficial consequences today.

Selected bibliography
"The Origin of Conservatism: Evolutionary theories suggest that conservative politics are necessary to govern a fallen man," National Review, December 22, 1997. (Cover story)
"The descent of man: can conservative concepts be derived from evolution? Critics respond to John O. McGinnis," National Review,  December 22, 1997.  Includes McGinnis' reply.
The World Trade Constitution (with Mark Movsesian, volume published in Chinese) The People's Press (2004)
  "The World Trade Organization as a Structure of Liberty" in Harvard Journal of Public Law and Policy, 2004

References

External links
Faculty page

American non-fiction writers
American legal scholars
Alumni of Balliol College, Oxford
Harvard Law School alumni
Phillips Exeter Academy alumni
Living people
Northwestern University Pritzker School of Law faculty
American scholars of constitutional law
Sullivan & Cromwell associates
Year of birth missing (living people)
Federalist Society members